The Sleeping Children is a marble sculpture by Francis Chantrey. The statue depicts Ellen-Jane and Marianne Robinson asleep in each other's arms on a bed. The statue was commissioned by the mother of the two children, also named Ellen-Jane Robinson, whose daughters had died in 1813 and 1814.

The statue was placed in the south east corner of Lichfield Cathedral in 1817 where it remains today. The work is considered to be one of Chantrey's finest works and one of the greatest works of English sculpture during the period.

Subject

The sculpture depicts the two daughters of Ellen-Jane Robinson (née Woodhouse) lying asleep on a bed in each other's arms. The tragic story depicted by the sculpture begins in 1812 when Ellen-Jane's husband, the clergyman Reverend William Robinson, who had recently become a prebendary of Lichfield Cathedral, contracted tuberculosis and died. Reverend William Robinson was in his thirties at the time of his death and left his wife with their two daughters.

In 1813 Ellen-Jane and her daughter, Ellen-Jane, were on a trip in Bath. During the trip the daughter's nightdress caught fire while she was preparing for bed and she died of the burns she received. The following year the younger daughter, Marianne, sickened and died while they were in London. Within three years Ellen-Jane had lost her entire family and in her distress she commissioned Francis Chantrey to secure a likeness of her lost children.

During a meeting with Chantrey, Ellen-Jane expressed to him a clear idea of what she wanted. She told Chantrey of how in the past she had watched as her daughters fell asleep in each other's arms and this is how she wanted them represented. She had also taken inspiration from Thomas Banks’ Boothby Monument in St Oswald's Church, Ashbourne. The statue depicts the daughter of Sir Brooke Boothby who had died during childhood. Chantrey visited this monument and then returned to his home to make a model of his proposed sculpture.

Construction and display

The statue was carved from white marble. The carving was entrusted to Chantrey's assistant, Mr. F. A. Lege, and it was his suggestion that the younger sister hold a bunch of snowdrops. The work was completed in time for the Royal Academy Art Exhibition of 1816, where it was a sensation. The statue was moved to the south east corner of Lichfield Cathedral in 1817 and remains there to this day. Above the statue is a black marble plaque dedicated to William Robinson (the father of the two children).

Legacy

Literature

In 1826 the poet William Lisle Bowles wrote a poem about the sculpture:

Television

In 2011 the sculpture was featured on the BBC programme Romancing the Stone: The Golden Ages of British Sculpture.

References

Lichfield Cathedral
Marble sculptures in the United Kingdom
Sculptures in England
1817 sculptures
Sculptures of children in the United Kingdom